Thomasia rugosa, commonly known as wrinkled leaf thomasia, is a species of flowering plant in the family Malvaceae and is endemic to the south-west of Western Australia. It has wrinkled, lance-shaped to egg-shaped leaves with wavy edges, and pink to mauve flowers.

Description
The edges of the leaves are wavy, the lower surface densely woolly-hairy. Flowering occurs from 
August to December.

Taxonomy and naming
Thomasia rugosa was first formally described in 1846 by Nikolai Turczaninow in the Bulletin de la Société Impériale des Naturalistes de Moscou, from specimens collected by James Drummond. The specific epithet (rugosa) means "wrinkled", referring to the leaves.

Distribution and habitat
Wrinkled leaf thomasia grows in heath and mallee shrubland between Lake Grace, Pithara and Donnybrook in the Avon Wheatbelt, Esperance Plains, Jarrah Forest and Mallee bioregions of south-western Western Australia.

Conservation status
Thomasia quercifolia is listed as "not threatened" by the Government of Western Australia Department of Biodiversity, Conservation and Attractions.

References

rugosa
Rosids of Western Australia
Plants described in 1806
Taxa named by Nikolai Turczaninow